The 1973–74 Greek Football Cup was the 32nd edition of the Greek Football Cup. The competition culminated with the Greek Cup Final, held at AEK Stadium on 16 June 1974. The match was contested by PAOK and Olympiacos, with PAOK winning by 4–3 on penalty shootout, after a 2–2 draw between the two teams.

Calendar

Qualifying round

28 clubs from Beta Ethniki entered the qualification round.

|}

*The match ended 4–2 for Nestos Chrysoupoli, but it was awarded to Pandramaikos.

Additional round

|}

Knockout phase
In the knockout phase, teams play against each other over a single match. If the match ends up as a draw, extra time will be played. If a winner doesn't occur after the extra time the winner emerges by penalty shoot-out.The mechanism of the draws for each round is as follows:
In the draw for the first round, the teams from the first division are seeded and the teams that passed the qualification round are unseeded. The seeded teams are drawn against the unseeded teams in their respective region. (The teams from Southern Greece form the first group and the teams from Central and Northern Greece form the second group.)
In the draw for the Round of 32, there are no seedings and teams from the different group can be drawn against each other in their respective region.
In the draws for the Round of 16 onwards, there are no geographical criteria and teams from different regions can be drawn against each other.

Bracket

First round

18 clubs from Alpha Ethniki and 32 clubs from Beta Ethniki entered the first round.

|}

Round of 32

|}

Round of 16

|}

*The match ended 1–1 in the regular time and Doxa Drama won 7–6 on penalties, but it was awarded 0–2 to Egaleo.

Quarter-finals

|}

Semi-finals

|}

*Held at Kaftanzoglio Stadium.

Final

The 30th Greek Cup Final was played at the AEK Stadium. It was the first Final that was decided on penalty shoot-out.

References

External links
Greek Cup 1973-74 at RSSSF

Greek Football Cup seasons
Greek Cup
1973–74 in Greek football